Robert Lichton (1631–1692) (a.k.a.: Leighton, Lichtoun, Lichtone, Lyton), Lord of Ulishaven, Forfarshire, Scotland and Lord of Tervik. He was a Lieutenant General in the Swedish Army and President of the Superior Court of Justice (hovrätt) at Åbo.

Career
Robert Lichton was born in 1631 at Humsland in Porvoo parish of the Swedish Empire (now Finland). He was the son of Colonel John Lichtoun of Ulishaven († 1636) and Catharina Gutherie. When his father fell at the Battle of Wittstock during the Thirty Years' War, Robert, while still a child, inherited his estate of Tervik. At the age of fifteen he entered the Swedish Army as a private and a Musketeer and participated in campaigns in Germany, Poland and Denmark. In 1661 Lichton joined the Swedish House of Nobility as a nobleman. He was promoted to the rank of Colonel in 1675 and created a baron. Lichton was appointed Governor of Estonia (Estland) He received this honor at just age fifty in 1681 while a Major general.

He rose to the rank of Lieutenant general in the Swedish army in 1685 and was appointed President of the Superior Court of Justice at Åbo just two years later. At this same time he was created a Royal Counselor, titled Count and Baron of Ulishaven, Lord of Tervik and of Peraniemi. Lichton greatly distinguished himself at the Battle of the Sound. At the Battle of Lund (1676), brave to the point of being foolhardy he was hit by several bullets, none of which were extracted. Lichton greatly distinguished himself at the Battle of the Sound.

Lichton was extremely strong and had a reputation for having a violent temper. He once had to leave the country after killing a regimental surgeon but was pardoned after paying a substantial fine. In Stockholm in 1667 he attacked a Colonel Bine with sword and pistol, for which he was arrested, but later was allowed to quietly go free with no formal charges. He was usually called Count Lichton by King Charles XI of Sweden who attended Robert's funeral in person in 1692.

Scottish heritage
Although born in Sweden Robert identified himself as Scottish. Before Robert was born his father, John Lichton, found himself in financial difficulties owing to his own father's debts. He sold his lands of Ulishaven in Forfarshire to Sir David Carnegie of Kinnaird for £40,000 Scots and paid his father's creditors. He saw an opportunity in becoming a Mercenary for Gustavus Adolphus of Sweden to fight in the Thirty Years' War. John Lichton emigrated to Sweden in 1614 where he began his career there as an Ensign in a cavalry regiment.

Sometime after 1675 (as he was at the time a colonel) He petitioned for a "birth brief" to allow him to register his arms with the Lord Lyon King at Edinburgh, which he did. His arms were: Argent, a Lion Rampant gules, armed and langued azur; crest a palm tree vert; motto: "Per adversa virtus" (courage through adversity). His change in motto from the old "Licht On" was probably in reference to his father's restoring the fortunes of this house.

Family
He was apparently married but had no male issue.

Notes

References

17th-century Scottish people
Scottish people of the Thirty Years' War
Swedish nobility
Swedish generals
Scottish expatriates in Finland
1631 births
1692 deaths